Zamia furfuracea is a cycad endemic to southeastern Veracruz state in eastern Mexico.

Names
Although not a palm tree (Arecaceae), its growth habit is superficially similar to a palm; therefore it is commonly known as cardboard palm or cardboard cycad. Other names include cardboard plant, cardboard sago, Jamaican sago, and Mexican cycad (from Mexican Spanish cícada mexicana). The plant's binomial name comes from the Latin zamia, for "pine nut", and furfuracea, meaning "mealy" or "scurfy".

Description
The plant has a short, sometimes subterranean trunk up to 20 cm broad and high, usually marked with scars from old leaf bases. It grows very slowly when young, but its growth accelerates after the trunk matures. Including the leaves, the whole plant typically grows to 1.3 m tall with a width of about 2 m.

The leaves radiate from the center of the trunk; each leaf is 50–150 cm long with a petiole 15–30 cm long, and 6-12 pairs of extremely stiff, pubescent (fuzzy) green leaflets. These leaflets grow 8–20 cm long and 3–5 cm wide. Occasionally, the leaflets are toothed toward the tips. The circular crowns of leaves resemble fern or palm fronds. They are erect in full sun, horizontal in shade.

Toxicity
All parts of the plant contain Cycasin and an unknown nervous system toxin which are poisonous to animals, including humans. The seeds are poisonous enough to kill small mammals such as dogs and cats, and cause liver and kidney failure, as well as eventual paralysis in humans. Dehydration sets in very quickly. No treatment for the poisoning is currently known.

Reproduction
 
This plant produces a rusty-brown cone in the center of the female plant. The egg-shaped female (seed-producing) cones and smaller male (pollen-producing) cone clusters are produced on separate plants.  Pollination is done by certain insects, namely the cycad weevil Rhopalotria mollis.

Conservation
Cardboard cycads can only be reproduced by the fleshy, brightly crimson-colored seeds produced by the female plants. The germination process is very slow and difficult to achieve in cultivation; as a result, many plants sold for horticultural use are illegally collected in the wild, leading to the species being classified as Endangered.

Cultivation
This plant is easy to care for and grows best in moist, well-drained soil. They do well in full sun or shade, but not in constant deep shade. They are fairly salt- and drought-tolerant but should be protected from extreme cold. They should occasionally be fed with palm food. After Cycas revoluta, this is probably the most popular cycad species in cultivation. In temperate regions, it is commonly grown as a houseplant and, in subtropical areas, as a container or bedding plant outdoors.

References 

 Bihrmann's Caudiforms
 Floridata
 Univ of Florida
 PACSOA

External links
 
 

furfuracea
Flora of Veracruz
Vulnerable plants